Fredie Videt Carmichael (born February 26, 1950) is a Republican who served in the Mississippi State Senate, representing District 33, which encompasses Lauderdale and Clarke counties in the eastern portion of Mississippi. He first entered the Senate in 2000, and left in April 2019.

Background
Carmichael is a native of Meridian, Mississippi. He graduated from Clarkdale High School in Lauderdale County and obtained two degrees in education from Mississippi State University at Starkville.

Career
Carmichael was a teacher, coach, and principal prior to running for office. He was first elected to the Senate in 1999 as a Democrat. In May 2002, Carmichael, citing "conscience," switched to Republican affiliation. He was welcomed to the party by state chairman Jim Herring. In 2015, Carmichael proposed a bill to prevent the Common Core State Standards Initiative from becoming law in Mississippi.

Personal life
Carmichael is married to the former Donna Smith. They have two children. He is a Baptist. In 2014, he was hospitalized after he fell in his apartment in the capital city of Jackson. He recovered several weeks later and successfully sought reelection in 2015, when he defeated Democrat Chase Callahan (born 1987), also of Meridian. Carmichael won the race, 75 to 25 percent.

See also
 List of American politicians who switched parties in office

References

1950 births
Living people
Educators from Mississippi
Politicians from Meridian, Mississippi
Mississippi State University alumni
Mississippi Democrats
Mississippi Republicans
Mississippi state senators
21st-century American politicians
Baptists from Mississippi